Saint-Pantaléon (Languedocien: Sent Pantaleon) is a former commune in the Lot department in south-western France. On 1 January 2019, it was merged into the new commune Barguelonne-en-Quercy.

Geography
The village lies in the valley of the ruisseau de Fraysse, a tributary of the Barguelonnette, which flows southwestward through the commune.

See also
Communes of the Lot department

References

Saintpantaleon
Populated places disestablished in 2019